Air Sunshine is an airline based in the United States and in Puerto Rico. It operates scheduled service to and from San Juan and Vieques, Puerto Rico, St. Lucia, Anguilla, Dominica, Sint Maarten, Nevis, St. Kitts, Tortola and Virgin Gorda in the British Virgin Islands and Saint Thomas, US Virgin Islands. Its main base is Fort Lauderdale, with a Caribbean hub located in San Juan, Puerto Rico.

As of 1982 the airline considered Fort Lauderdale to be its corporate headquarters; however, the main base of operations is located in San Juan, Puerto Rico. Air Sunshine's website lists two separate post office boxes for contacts, one in Fort Lauderdale and another in San Juan.

Destinations
Air Sunshine operates a series of short routes between its destinations.

Anguilla - Clayton J. Lloyd International Airport
Dominica - Douglas–Charles Airport
George Town - Exuma International Airport
Nevis - Vance W. Armory International Airport
St. Croix - Henry E. Rohlsen Airport
St. Thomas - Cyril E. King International Airport
San Juan - Luis Muñoz Marín International Airport
Saint Kitts - Robert L. Bradshaw International Airport
Saint Lucia - George F. L. Charles Airport
Sint Maarten - Princess Juliana International Airport
Tortola - Terrance B. Lettsome International Airport
Vieques - Antonio Rivera Rodríguez Airport
Virgin Gorda - Virgin Gorda Airport

Former Destinations
Kingston - Norman Manley International Airport

Fleet
 the Air Sunshine fleet included:

In August 2006, the fleet consisted of 1 Beechcraft 1900C and 2 Saab 340A aircraft.

Other previously operated aircraft:

Embraer EMB-110 Bandeirante

Accidents and incidents
Air Sunshine had a better than average safety record between 1997 and 2004 per the NTSB. Air Sunshine did have a crash that claimed two fatalities July 13, 2003 on a flight from Fort Lauderdale to Abaco Island, Bahamas. An engine failure caused an at sea ditching about 6 miles short of the Abaco Island airport. In that same period there were a few incidents.

On January 7, 2007, an Air Sunshine Cessna 402, had hydraulic problems with the landing gear, in a flight from Virgin Gorda to San Juan (SJU), there were no injuries and the pilot managed to land the plane safely. The airport was closed for approximately 30 minutes until the emergency ceased.

On February 11, 2017, an Air Sunshine Cessna 402 overran the runway on Virgin Gorda following a brakes failure. The UK Air Accidents Investigation board has reported 'shortfalls' in procedure and recommended that the FAA review Air Sunshine's operations and maintenance.

References

External links
Official Website
Airlines Tickets Refunds
Flight Delay Compensation

Regional airlines of the United States
Companies based in Fort Lauderdale, Florida
Airlines based in Florida
Airlines established in 1982
1982 establishments in Florida